Belogorka, also known as Belogorskiy, (Belogor, بەلوگور; , Belogorka) is a town in Aktobe Region, west Kazakhstan.

References

Aktobe Region
Cities and towns in Kazakhstan